Rohr is the surname of:

Military
Franz Freiherr Rohr von Denta (1854-1927), last commander of the Austro-Hungarian First Army
Davis C. Rohr (1929– ), Major General in the US Air Force

Sports
Alain Rohr (born 1971), Swiss hurdler
Bernd Rohr (1937-2022), German cyclist
Billy Rohr (born 1945), baseball player
Gernot Rohr (born 1953), German football player and manager
Jean-Philippe Rohr (born 1961), French footballer
Les Rohr (1946–2020), baseball player
Maximilian Rohr (born 1995), German footballer
Nadine Rohr (born 1977), Swiss pole vaulter
Oskar Rohr (1912–1988), German footballer

Other
George Rohr (born 1954), American businessman and philanthropist
Jim Rohr CEO of PNC Financial Services
John Rohr (1934–2011), political science professor at Virginia Tech
Moritz von Rohr (1868-1940) optical scientist at Carl Zeiss in Jena
Richard Rohr (1943- ) Franciscan priest
Sami Rohr, Jewish philanthropist; see Sami Rohr Prize for Jewish Literature
Tony Rohr, British-German actor

See also
Röhr (surname)

German-language surnames